Aqcheh Kand (also Romanized as Āqcheh Kand, Āqcheh Kan, Āqjā Kand, Āqjeh Kand, and Ak-Dzhakand) is a village in Qaqazan-e Sharqi Rural District, in the Central District of Takestan County, Qazvin Province, Iran. At the 2006 census, its population was 238, in 61 families.

References 

Populated places in Takestan County